Dunn is an unincorporated community in Sullivan Township, Moultrie County, Illinois, United States.

References

Unincorporated communities in Moultrie County, Illinois
Unincorporated communities in Illinois